Chen Ruolin (born 12 December 1992) is a Chinese diver.  Her most recent competition saw her win the synchronized 10 metre platform diving event with her partner Liu Huixia at the 2016 Summer Olympics in Rio de Janeiro.

Career
Chen was born in Nantong, Jiangsu. She won the gold medals in the women's 10m platform and 10m synchronized platform at the 2008 Summer Olympics in Beijing for Team China, then duplicated the double gold performance at the London 2012 Summer Olympics.

In the 2011 World Aquatics Championships held in Shanghai, Chen won two gold medals for Women's 10 m platform and Women's 10 m synchro platform (partnering Wang Hao). She became the first Chinese female diver who claimed all the gold medals in women's platform events in Olympic Games, World Cup and World Championships.

In 2014, she lit the torch at the 2014 Summer Youth Olympics in the Nanjing Olympic Sports Centre.

In the 2016 Summer Olympics she won her fifth Olympic gold medal at the 10m synchronised event and became only the third Chinese athlete to win 5 Olympic gold medals. In October 2016 Chen announced her retirement from diving due to a neck injury.

Performance Timeline

Women's 10 m platform

Women's 10 m synchro platform

References

2008teamchina

1992 births
Living people
Sportspeople from Nantong
Chinese female divers
Olympic divers of China
Olympic medalists in diving
Olympic cauldron lighters
2016 Olympic gold medalists for China
Divers at the 2016 Summer Olympics
Divers at the 2012 Summer Olympics
Divers at the 2008 Summer Olympics
Medalists at the 2012 Summer Olympics
Medalists at the 2008 Summer Olympics
Asian Games silver medalists for China
Asian Games gold medalists for China
Asian Games medalists in diving
Divers at the 2006 Asian Games
Divers at the 2010 Asian Games
Divers at the 2014 Asian Games
World Aquatics Championships medalists in diving
Medalists at the 2006 Asian Games
Medalists at the 2010 Asian Games
Medalists at the 2014 Asian Games
Universiade medalists in diving
Nanjing Sport Institute alumni
Universiade gold medalists for China
Medalists at the 2011 Summer Universiade
Renmin University of China alumni